

The Christian Initiative Romero (CIR) is an incorporated association based in Münster, Germany. supporting labour law and human rights in Central American countries. Its core area of responsibility consists in the support of grassroots organizations in Central America. The CIR also runs campaigns in Germany and promotes education on developmental topics with the aim of building bridges between these developing countries and Germany. It is named after the Roman Catholic bishop Óscar Romero, and commits to his fight against injustice and his support for the poor, the marginalised and the persecuted.

Campaigns 
The CIR has been involved with a number of initiatives and campaigns, including:
the Clean Clothes Campaign (CCC), dedicated to improving the working conditions in the garment industry and calls for minimum standards and independent monitoring systems
Corporate Accountability (CorA), a network of organisations in Germany that demand companies respect human rights and fulfil internationally accepted social and environmental standards
ProNATs, Pro los Niños y Adolescentes Trabajadores (For Working Children and Adolescents), a network of organisations and individuals that fight against the exploitation of working children
Common Code for the Coffee Community (4C), founded in 2004 by NGOs, syndicates, public institutions and the German Coffee Union, aims to set social and ecological standards for a globally responsible coffee production

Activities 
The CIR supports about 90 projects in Central America every year. These projects focus on women's self-determination, respect for human rights, promoting social rights of the native population, dignified working conditions, respect for and support of working children, ecology, and a political strengthening of the civil society. The CIR also provides emergency help when natural disasters strike. It organizes protest activities if human rights are violated, and cooperates with other networks and organisations to achieve its goals.

The CIR investigates areas like the garment industry or human and children's rights in Central America. The results of the research projects are published in brochures and leaflets, and the CIR also publishes a free quarterly bulletin about current political and social issues in Central America.

The work of the CIR is financed by membership fees and donations, financial contributions from churches and private foundations, public grants and contributions from the Romero Foundation.

References

External links 
Website of the CIR

Development charities based in Germany
Fair trade organizations
Liberation theology
Companies established in 1981
Non-profit organisations based in North Rhine-Westphalia
1981 establishments in Germany
Óscar Arnulfo Romero